Telmen Lake is a saltwater lake in Zavkhan, Mongolia. Three islands are located in the lake, which is a gathering point for migratory birds. The water salinity is 6.49-7.61‰.

Average temperature ranges from -32 °C in January to 12 °C in July. From 6,210 to 3,960 years ago, as determined by radiocarbon dating, Lake Telmen was between 15 and 20m shallower than it is at present.

References

Lakes of Mongolia
Saline lakes of Asia